Sandy Newsome is a Republican member of the Wyoming House of Representatives representing District 24 since January 8, 2019. Prior to her election, Newsome was a member of the Wyoming Board of Tourism from 2011 until 2017.

Elections

2016
After incumbent Republican Representative Sam Krone was charged with embezzlement, Newsome ran for the District 24 seat as an independent, having missed the filing deadline. She placed third in the general election, behind Republican nominee and Representative-elect Scott Court and Democratic nominee Paul Fees.

2018
When incumbent Republican Representative Scott Court declined to run for reelection, Newsome ran as a Republican, and won the primary with 60% of the vote. She defeated Democrat Paul Fees with 72% of the vote.

References

Living people
People from Sterling, Colorado
Republican Party members of the Wyoming House of Representatives
21st-century American women politicians
21st-century American politicians
Year of birth missing (living people)